Uhryniv is a name of number of villages in Western Ukraine.

Villages
 Uhryniv, Tysmenytsia Raion
 Uhryniv, Lviv Oblast
 Uhryniv, Ternopil Oblast
 Uhryniv, Volyn Oblast

Railway stations
 Uhryniv railway station, a railway stop of the Lviv Railways Ivano-Frankivsk administration

See also
 Staryi Uhryniv, a village of Kalush Raion, Ivano-Frankivsk Oblast
 Seredniy Uhryniv, a village of Kalush Raion, Ivano-Frankivsk Oblast